Birthday present may refer to:

A present given in celebration of a person's birthday
The Birthday Present, 1957 film
The Birthday Present (novel), a 2008 novel by Ruth Rendell
 "Birthday Presence" a 2009 episode of Ghost Whisperer